This is the list of recipients of the Civil Order of Alfonso X, the Wise:

Collar 
 Francisco Franco Bahamonde (1939) Spanish dictator
 António de Oliveira Salazar, prime minister of Portugal (1949)
 Manuel Gonçalves Cerejeira, Cardinal-Patriarch of Lisbon (1949)
 José Ibáñez Martín (1951)
 José María Velasco Ibarra, presidente de la República Ecuatoriana (1955)
 Ramón Menéndez Pidal (1959)
 Hassan II, rey de Marruecos (1989)
since 1990 no conferments.

Grand Cross

1940 
 José Agustín Pérez del Pulgar (a título póstumo).
 Darío Fernández Iruega
 Miguel Asín Palacios
 Felipe Clemente de Diego
 Silvestre Sancho
 Tomás Tascón
 Antonio de Gregorio Rocasolano
 Joaquín María Castellarnau y Llopart
 José García Siñériz
 Manuel de Falla
 Ignacio Zuloaga Zabaleta
 Fernando Álvarez de Sotomayor
 Pedro Muguruza Otaño
 Fernando Enriques de Salamanca

1941 
 Leonardo Santa Isabel
 Ignacio María Smith Ibarra
 Juan Irigoyen Guerricabeitia
 Enrico Conde di San Martino Valperga
 José Arce
 Adolf Schulten
 Carlos Francisco Benítez Dalfó

1942 
 Joaquín Turina Pérez.
 Eduardo Marquina y Angulo
 Wenceslao González Oliveros
 Manuel Gómez-Moreno Martínez

1943 
 Pío Zabala y Lera
 Eduardo Callejo de la Cuesta
 Modesto López Otero

1944 
 Jacinto Benavente
 Bernardo de Granda Calleja
 Eduardo Chicharro y Agüera
 Manuel Benedito y Vives
 Mario Figueredo
 Carlos Jiménez Díaz
 Francisco Gómez del Campillo
 Fernando Rodríguez Fornos
 Mariano Benlliure y Gil
 Clementina Albéniz Pascual

1945 
 Leonardo de la Peña y Díaz
 Gustavo Cordeiro Ramos
 José Gascón y Marín
 José Mariano Mota Salado
 Juan Marcilla Arrazola
 Aurelio María Escarré
 Víctor Espinós Moltó
 Felipe Garin Ortiz de Taranco

1946 
 Arcadio Larraona Saralegui
 Antonio Pereira Sousa de Cámara
 Arnald Steiger
 Anselmo Albareda
 Cruz Ángel Gallástegui Unamuno
 Miguel Odriozola Pietas
 Aurelio María Espinosa
 Archer Milton Huntington
 José Luis Gómez Navarro
 Eduardo Torroja Miret
 Eduardo de Vitoria
 Conrado del Campo
 José Martínez Ruiz

1947 
 Dulce María Loynaz
 José María Bover
 Daniel Blanxart Pedrals
 Albino González
 José Gálvez Ginachero
 Ramón Castroviejo Briones
 Narciso Correal y Freyre de Andrade
 José Antonio Lezcano y Ortega
 Severino Aznar Embid

1948 
 Fernando de Andrade y Pires de Lima
 Pío García Escudero y Fernández de Urrutia
 José María Pemán y Pemartín
 Rafael Sánchez Mazas
 Concepción Espina Tagle
 Moisés Bensabat Amzalek
 Enrique R. Larreta
 Alexander Fleming
 Blanca de los Ríos
 José Iturbi
 Belisario Gache Pirán
 José Nicoláu Sabater

1949 
 José Joaquín Casas
 Jorge Beristain
 Maximino José de Morces Correia
 Cristóbal Losada y Puga
 José Pizzardo
 Antonio de la Torre y del Cerro
 Carlos Blanco Soler
 Esteban Terradas Illa
 Julio de Urquijo e Ibarra
 José Caeiro da Mata
 António Faria Carneiro Pacheco
 Nicolás Franco Bahamonde
 Eugenio Cuello Calón

1950 
 José Castán Tobeñas
 José María Fernández-Locheda y Menéndez-Valdés
 José María Albareda y Herrera
 Agustín González de Amezúa y Mayo
 Taha Hussein Bey

1951 
 Antonio Fernández Rodríguez
 H. van Waeyenbergh
 Enrique Luño Peña
 Cayetano Mergelina Luna
 Antonio Marín Ocete
 Sabino Alvárez-Gendín Blanco
 Jesús Rubio y García-Mina
 Luis Ortiz Muñoz
 José María Escrivá
 Justo Pérez de Urbel
 José López-Ortiz
 Carlos Ruiz García
 Antonio Elola Olaso
 Federico Marés Deulovol
 Esteban Madruga Jiménez
 Pedro Dulanto
 Juan Mendoza Rodríguez
 Francisco Javier Sánchez Cantón
 Manuel Suárez y Suárez

1952 
 Rafael Cort Alvarez
 Rafael Azula Barrera
 José Vascongadas Calderón
 Pedro Calmón Monia de Bittencourt
 Nayi al-Asil
 Silverio de Santa Teresa
 Benjamín de Arriba Castro
 Daniel Llorente y Federico
 Bartolomé Pérez Casas
 Francisco Martín Lagos
 Jamil al Madfai
 Hunter Guthrie
 Mili Porta
 Eugenio d'Ors y Rovira
 Juan Vigón Suerodíaz
 Carlton Joseph Huntley Hayes
 Daniel Vázquez Díaz
 Jesús Guridi Vidaola
 Francisco Barbado y Viejo

1953 
 Vittorino Veronese
 Roque Esteban Scarpa
 Pablo Laloux Van-der-Heyden-a-Hauzeur
 Mariano Ibérico Rodríguez
 José Ramón Guizado
 Felipe Ferreiro
 Blas Pérez González
 Joaquín Rodrigo Vidre
 José Cubiles Ramos
 Gustavo Urrutia González
 Andrés Segovia
 Juan Zaragüeta Bengoechea
 Crisanto Luque
 Carlos María de la Torre
 Joaquín Balaguer
 Ángel Ayala
 Manuel Cavaleiro de Ferreira
 Geronima Pecson
 Lorenzo Riber Campíns

1954 
 Jaime Eyzaguirre
 José Cantos Figuerola
 Antonio Marín Hervás
 Mariano Ossorio Arévalo
 Gustavo Martínez Zubiría
 Manuel Lora Tamayo
 Carlos González Iglesias
 Daniel Henao y Henao
 Antonio Tovar Llorente
 Hermenegildo Anglada Camarasa
 Rafael García Rodríguez
 Francisco de P. Navarro Martín
 Manuel González Martí
 Henri Breuil
 Pedro Troncoso Sánchez
 José Martínez Cobo
 Víctor G. Urrutia
 Oscar Miró Quesada
 Francisco Graña Reyes
 Agustín Marín y Bertrán de Lis
 Carlos García Oviedo
 Ángel Arrúe Astiazarán

1955 
 Ramón María Aller Ulloa
 José Cartañá y Anglés
 Wenceslao Benitez Inglott (a título póstumo)
 Rafael Bernal Jiménez
 Javier Baeza
 Edgar Rego dos Santos
 B. Velloso
 Alejandro Gallinal Heber
 Camilo Alonso Vega
 Enrique Romero de Torres
 Jaime Nebot Velasco
 Luis Olariaga Pujana
 José González de la Peña y de la Encina
 Joaquín González de la Peña y de la Encina
 Vicente Lores
 Agostino Gemelli
 Pedro Gonzáles Rincones
 José Loreto Arismendi
 Enrique de Marchena y Dujarrie
 José María Cuenco
 Braz de Souza Arruda
 Luis Martínez Miltos
 Óscar Herrera Palacios
 José Cándido de Motta Fillio
 Aurelio Cayceda Ayerbe

1956 
 Gilberto Marinho
 Alberto Zerega Pombona
 Clovis Salgado
 Juan Gavala Laborde
 Víctor Escribano García
 Jaime Pujiula Dilme
 Joaquín Ruíz-Giménez Cortés
 Juan Manzano y Manzano
 José Solís Ruiz
 Pedro Gual Villalbí
 Julián Pemartín Sanjuán
 Enrique de Guzmán Martínez
 Patricio Palomar Collado

1957 
 Rafael Leónidas Trujillo Molina
 Francisco Planell Riera
 José Antonio Artigas Sanz
 Celso Da Rocha Miranda
 Raúl Peña
 Marcelo José das Neves Alves Caetano
 Francisco Buscaróns Ubeda
 Segismundo Royo-Villanova y Fernández Cavada
 Mohamed bin Turki
 Lorenzo Miguélez Domínguez
 Pilar Primo de Rivera

1958 

 Antonio Gallego Burín
 Emilio Gómez Ayáu
 Maurice van Hemeirijck
 Heinrich Drimmel
 John Cockoroft
 Ataúlfo Argenta (a título póstumo).
 Luis Alonso Muñoyerro
 Antonio Cortés Lladó

1959 
 José María de Corral García
 Eduardo Toldrá Soler
 Óscar Esplá Triay
 José Capuz Mamano
 Joan Miró
 Valentín de Zubiaurre Aguirrezábal
 Ramón Gómez de la Serna
 Wenceslao Fernández Flórez
 José Yarnoz Larrosa
 José Entrecanales Ibarra
 Juan Gorostidi Alonso
 Ramón Iribarren Cabanillas
 Miguel Benlloch Martínez
 Gonzalo Ceballos Fernández de Córdoba
 Manuel de Torres Martínez
 Manuel Usandizaga Soraluce
 Emilio Díaz-Caneja Candanedo
 Rafael Vara López
 Jesús García Orcoyen
 Ramón María Roca Sastre
 Federico de Castro Bravo
 Carlos Ruiz del Castillo
 Luis Legaz Lacambra
 Ciriaco Pérez Bustamante
 José María Millás Vallicrosa
 Luis Pericot García
 Juan de Contreras y López de Ayala
 Antonio Romañá Pujó
 Ricardo San Juan Llosá
 César González Gómez
 José María Orts Aracil
 Antonio Ríus Miró
 Julio Rey Pastor
 Antonio Torroja Miret
 Jacques Chevalier

1960 
 Juan Marino García-Marquina y Rodrigo
 Francisco García-Valdecasas Santamaría
 Agustín Pedro Pons
 José Pascual Vila
 José María de Sagarra y de Castellarnáu
 Juan María Bonelli Rubio

1961 
 Abelardo Bonilla Baldares
 José Viñas Mey
 Fernando Martín-Sánchez Julián
 Rafael Calvo Rodés
 Juan Adsuara Ramos
 Juan Cabrera Felipe
 José Corts Grau
 Miguel Allúe Salvador
 Carlos Alberto Puigrredón
 Arturo Capdevila
 Javier Goerlich Lleó
 Antonio Magariños García
 Pascual Bravo Sanfeliú
 Joaquín Garrigues y Díaz-Cañabate
 Emilio Alarcos García
 Pedro Pineda Gutiérrez
 Joaquín Vargas Méndez
 Alfonso Ocampo Londoño
 René Schick
 Theodore von Kármán
 Antonio Revenga Carbonell
 Luis Martín de Vidales
 Enrique Giménez Girón
 Alfredo R. Vitolo
 Luis Jordana de Pozas
 Ricardo Montequi y Díaz Plaza
 Luis Almarcha Hernández
 Eduardo Hernández Pacheco y Estevan
 Octavio A. Vallarino

1962 
 Louis Armand
 Eduardo Angulo Otaolaurruchi
 José Maldonado y Fernández del Torco
 Emilio Jimeno Gil
 Patricio Peñalver Bachiller
 Amandio Tabares
 Epifanio Ridruejo Botija
 Joao Pizarro Gabizo de Coelho
 Galo Sánchez y Sánchez

1963 
 Alberto Navarro González
 Alfonso Grosso Sánchez
 Aurelio Miró Quesada-Sosa
 Jean Roche
 Francisco García del Cid y Arias
 Francisco de Paula Leite Pinto
 Francisco Iñiguez Almech
 José L. Torrontegui e Ibarra
 Manuel Soto Redondo
 Arturo Rubinstein
 Vicente Martínez Risco y Agüero
 Ernesto Halffter Escriche
 Eduardo López Palop
 Piedad Novales Gomez

1964 
 José Vives Gatell
 Ginés Guzmán Giménez
 Alfonso García Gallo
 Rafael de Balbín Lucas
 Armando G Melón y Ruiz de Gordejuela
 José Luis Rodríguez Candela
 Juan Luis de la Ynfiesta Molero
 Juan Manuel Martínez Moreno
 Enrique Gutiérrez Ríos
 Joaquín Calvo Sotelo
 Tomás García Figueras
 Antonio Pastor de la Meden
 Friedrich Balke
 Mariano Navarro Rubio
 Ignacio Barraquer y Barraquer
 Agustín Segura Iglesias
 José Sinués Urbiola
 Alfredo Silva Santiago
 Leonardo Prieto Castro
 Carl Schuricht
 Ángel Santos Ruiz
 Antonio Tena Artigas
 Manuel Batlle Vázquez
 Higinio Anglés Pamiés
 Diego Angulo Iñiguez
 Juan Antonio Suanzes Fernández
 Rafael García y García de Castro
 Nicanor Zabaleta Zala
 Luis Ceballos Fernández de Córdoba
 Clemente Sáez García
 Ramón Esteruelas Rolando
 José Camón Aznar
 Héctor Gros Espiell
 Abdel Kader Hatem

1965 
 Emeterio Sendino de la Rosa
 Ramón Castilla Pérez
 José María Ríos García
 Fidel Jorge López Aparicio
 Santiago Alcobé Noguer
 Gabriel Alomar Esteve
 Luis Iglesias Iglesias
 Ángel Jorge Echeverri
 Carlos San López
 Felice Battaglia
 José Eugenio de Baviera y Borbón
 Ruperto Sanz y Sanz
 Emilio Novoa González
 Luis Martínez Kleiser

1966 
 José Manuel González Valcárcel
 Gratiniano Nieto Gallo
 Enrique Costa Novella
 Antonio González y González
 Luis Bernaola Churruca
 Emilio Muñoz Fernández
 José Ortiz Echagüe
 Félix Hernández Giménez
 Leopoldo Querol Roso
 Francisco Hernández-Tejero Jorge
 José Castañeda Chornet
 Fernando de Castro Rodríguez
 Bernardo Houssay
 José Sansón Terán
 Ángel González Álvarez
 Joaquín Tena Artigas
 Ricardo Magdaleno Redondo
 Luis Menéndez Pidal Álvarez
 Alfonso Muñoz Alonso

1967 
 José Manuel Rivas Sacconi
 Francisco Navarro Borrás
 Regino Sainz de la Maza
 Laureano López Rodó
 Manuel Cardenal Iracheta
 Alfonso de la Peña Pineda
 Marcelo Jorissen Breack
 José García Santesmases
 Cristino García Alfonso
 José Antonio Martínez de Villarreal
 Gerhard Stoltenberg
 Marcelino Olaechea Loizaga
 José Virgili Vinadé
 Vicente Puyal Gil
 Manuel Alvar López
 Antonio Calderón Quijano
 Augusto de Castro Sampaio Corte Real
 Mohammed Rzzal Salama
 Eduardo López Chávarri Marco
 Gerardo Diego Cendoya
 José Sebastián Bandarán
 Conrado Blanco Plaza
 Francisco Olid Maysounave
 Francisco Hernández Borondo

1968
 Saroit Okacha
 Antonio Ángel Valero Vicente
 Juan José Espinosa San Martín
 Jesús Romeo Gorría
 Joaquín Ocón García
 José María Guerra Zunzunegui
 Juan Puig-Sureda Saiz
 Máximo Cuervo Rodigales
 Isidoro Martín Martínez
 Vicente Aleixandre Ferrandis
 Manuel Sendagorta Aramburu
 Wifredo Ricart Medina
 José María Sánchez
 Vicente Mortes Alfonso
 Francisco Ponz Piedrafita
 Eleuterio González Zapatero
 José María Aguirre Gonzalo
 Oscar Pinochet
 Luis Arizmendi Espuñes
 Antonio Valero Vicente

1969 
 Enrique Fontana Codina
 Félix Moreno de la Cova
 Baldomero Palomares Díaz
 José Paz Maroto
 Antonio Pérez Marín
 José Joaquín Viñals Guimerá
 Juan Echevarría Gangoiti
 José María Mendoza y Guinea
 Florentino Pérez Embid
 Agustín de Asís Garrote
 José María Muller y Abadal
 José María de Porcioles Colomer
 Gabriel Betancur Mejía
 Pedro Segú Martín
 Luis Sánchez Belda
 Eugenio López y López
 José Botella Llusiá
 Justiniano Casas Peláez
 Federico Mayor Zaragoza
 Manuel Jesús García Garrido
 José María Martínez Val
 Fernando Luis de Ybarra y López-Dóriga
 Adolfo Rincón de Arellano
 Gonzalo Fernández de la Mora y Mon
 Torcuato Fernández-Miranda
 Jaime Guasp Delgado
 Eduardo García de Enterría y Martínez Carande
 Francisco Antoli Candela
 Alfredo Arrisueño Cornejo
 Alfonso Arroyo Rebolly
 Javier Rubio García Mina
 José Ramón Pérez Alvarez-Ossorio
 Ricardo Díez Hochleitner
 Alberto Monreal Luque
 Juan Bosch Marín
 Federico Rodríguez Rodríguez
 Rafael Díaz-Llanos y Lecuona
 Carlos Ros Rico
 José María García-Lomas Cossío
 Francisco Ponz Piedrafita

1970 
 José de Azeredo Perdigao
 Rafael Couchoud Sebastiá
 Isidoro Macabich Llobet
 Fernando Jorge Portillo Scharfhausen
 Carlos S. Muñoz Cabezón
 José Luis Villar Palasí
 Pedro Roselló Blanch
 José Ramón de Villa y Elizaga
 Carlos Pinilla Turiño
 Luis Suárez Fernández
 Jaime Campmany y Díez de Revenga
 Gregorio López Bravo
 Licinio de la Fuente y de la Fuente
 Manuel Albaladejo García
 Enrique de la Mata Gorostizaga
 Fermín Gutiérrez de Soto
 Domingo Liotta
 Frans Van Mechelen
 Albert Parisis
 Guillermo León Valencia
 Octavio Arizmendi Posada

1971 
 José Luis Meilán Gil
 Vicente Villar Palasí
 Julio Salvador Díaz-Benjumea
 Ignacio Ribas Marqués
 Eduardo Primo Yufera
 Manuel Arias Senoseaín
 Pedro Enrique Le Clercq
 Lucio del Álamo Urrutia
 Pedro Aragoneses Alonso
 Manuel Durán Sacristán
 Fabián Estapé Rodríguez
 Juan García-Frías y Frías
 Juan Gich y Bech de Careda
 Francisco Javier Irastorza Revuelta
 Prudencio Dandín Carrasco
 Luis Nozal López
 Mariano Sebastián Herrador
 Adolfo Suárez González
 Emilio Garrigues y Díaz-Cañabate
 Joaquín Gutiérrez Cano
 José Utrera Molina
 Vicente Sierra y Ponce de León
 Andrés de la Oliva de Castro
 Luís Carlos Galán
 José Luis Cantini
 Alejandro Maldonado Aguirre
 Manuel Díez-Alegría Gutiérrez
 José María Torres Murciano

1972 
 Juan Bautista Nieto Fernández
 Ulpiano González Medina
 Juan José Barcia Goyanes
 Víctor Buen Lozano
 Marcial Corral Arnaiz
 Félix Hernández Gil
 Eduardo Junco Mendoza
 Rafael Mendizábal Allende
 Luis Sánchez Agesta
 Gabriel Solé Villalonga
 Manuel Alonso Olea
 Florencio Valenciano Almoyna
 Emilio Larrodera López
 Francisco Gallego Balmaseda
 Gabriel Barceló Matutano
 Jesús Florentino Fueyo Álvarez
 Julio Martínez Santa-Olalla
 Alfredo Carpio Becerra
 Emilio Romero Gómez
 Blas Tello y Fernández-Caballero
 Arturo Caballero López
 Carlos Iglesias Selgas
 Antonio J. García y Rodríguez-Acosta
 Francisco Javier Carvajal Ferrer
 Juan Abelló Pascual
 Fernando Fuentes de Villavicencio
 Luis Martínez de Irujo y Artázcoz
 Fernando Martínez-Vara de Rey y Córdoba-Benavente
 Pío Cabanillas Gallas
 Antonio Puigvert Gorro
 Víctor Arroyo Arroyo
 José Pérez del Arco y Rodríguez

1973 
 Manuel Fraga Iribarne
 Enrique Pérez-Hernández y Moreno
 Felipe Lucena Conde
 Ángel Hoyos de Castro
 Francisco Ruiz Jarabo
 Ramón Palacios Rubio
 Juan Materno Vázquez
 José Ramón de Masaguer Fernández
 Eduardo Guzmán Esponda
 Arturo Fernández Cruz
 José Aguilar Peris
 Carlos Arias Navarro
 Rafael Baguena Candela
 Manuel Clavero Arévalo
 Gabriel Ferraté Pascual
 José Luis Ramos Figueras
 José Ramón del Sol Fernández
 Carlos Felice Cardot
 Alberto Wagner de Reyna
 José Ignacio San Martín López
 Ramón Calatayud Sierra
 Edgard Sanabria Arcia
 Francisco Arán López
 Efrén Borrajo Dacruz
 Carlos González-Bueno y Bocos
 José Luis Taboada García

1974 
 Fernando Martorell Otzet
 Helmut Schlunk
 Luis Alberto Sánchez Sánchez
 Manuel F. Rocheta
 Antonio Pinilla Sánchez Concha
 Juan de Dios Guevara Romero
 Alberto F. Cañas Escalante
 Manuel Souto Vilas
 Ángel Scandella García Otermín
 Enrique Pérez Comendador
 Santiago Pardo Canalís
 Ignacio Martel Viniegra
 Juan Bautista Manya Alcoverro
 Ciríaco Laguna Serrano
 Guillermo Guastavino Gallent
 Ricardo García de Carellán y Ugarte
 Agustín Vicente Gella
 Gabriel Tous Amorós
 Vicente Lozano López
 Mariano Lázaro Franco
 Jesús Hernández Perera
 Jorge Carreras Llansana
 José Giménez Mellado
 Francisco J. Saraleguí Platero
 José Luis García Garrido
 Jesús Sancho Rof
 Nicolás Cabrera Sánchez
 Ignacio Agustí Peypoch
 Juan Oró Florensa
 Emilio Orozco Díaz
 Eduardo Ortiz de Landázuri
 Francisco Guijarro Arrizabalaga
 Leonardo Legaspi
 Justino Sansón Balladares
 Carlos P. Rómulo
 Mohamed Al Nueser
 María Elvira Muñiz
 Enrique Pérez Olivares
 Tomás Polanco Alcántara
 Pedro Pablo Bárnola

1975 
 José Luis Messía Jiménez
 Luis Martín-Ballesteros y Costea
 Ramón Otero Pedrayo
 Angel Vián Ortuño
 César Albiñana García-Quintana
 Eugenio Lostau Román
 Francisco Luis López Carballo
 Miguel Ramón Izquierdo
 Manuel Valentín Gamazo y de Cárdenas
 Enrique Segura Iglesias
 José Miguel Gamboa Loyarte
 Enrique Fuentes Quintana
 Vicente Quílez Fuentes
 Antonio de Juan Abad
 Adib Lujami
 Antonio Gallego Morell
 Mariano Jaquotot Uzuriaga
 Obdulio Fernández Rodríguez
 Manuel Moreno López
 Raimundo Pérez-Hernández y Moreno
 Benito Rodríguez Ríos
 Alberto Sols García
 Montserrat Caballé
 María Luisa Caturla y Caturla
 Luis Moreno Salcedo
 Shozo Hotta
 Angel Martínez Fuertes
 Horacio Julio Bustamante Gómez
 José Blat Gimeno
 Juan de Arespacochaga y Felipe
 Álvaro Gil Varela

1976 
 Paul Mikat
 Guillermo Morón Montero
 Antonio Barbadillo y García de Velasco
 José María Vidal Llenas
 Alfonso Martín Escudero
 José García Fernández
 Miguel Romero Moreno
 Rafael Leoz de la Fuente
 Miguel Lucas Tomás
 Eloy López García
 Manuel Hidalgo Huertas
 Vital Aza Fernández-Nespral
 Gabriel Artero Guirao
 José Luis Álvarez Sala Moris
 Luis Alonso-Castrillo y Aladren
 Luis Pescador del Hoyo
 Julio Ortiz Vázquez
 Sixto Obrador Alcalde
 Antonio Edo Quintana

1977 
 Marcelo Terceros Banzer
 Gonzalo J. Facio Segreda
 Fernando Volio Jiménez, Ministro de Educación Pública de Costa Rica
 Arístides Royo, Ministro de Educación de Panamá
 Leopoldo Benítez Vinueza
 Dámaso Alonso y Fernández de las Redondas
 Ramón Carande y Thovar
 Fermín García Bernardo y de la Sala
 Antonio González-Meneses y Meléndez
 José María Hueso Ballester
 Fernando Rodríguez-Avial Azcunaga
 Martín Santos Romero
 Alfonso de la Serna y Gutiérrez Repide
 Federico Sopeña Ibáñez
 Alfred Verdross
 Ramón Areces Rodríguez
 Antonio Lecuona Hardison
 Juan de Dios López González
 Manuel Olivencia Ruiz
 Justo Pastor Rupérez
 Pedro Pi Calleja
 Manuel Suárez Perdiguero
 Roberto Terradas Vía
 Rodrigo Uría González
 Robert de Boisseson, Jefe de la Delegación Francesa de la Comisión Límite Pirineos, ex Embajador de Francia en España
 José Marín Cañas, Presidente del Instituto Costarricense de Cultura Hispánica
 Carmen Naranjo

1978 
 Vicente García de Diego
 Christian Beullac
 Otto Eléspuru Revoredo
 Abelardo Algora Marco
 Ursicino Álvarez Suárez
 Pedro Laín Entralgo
 Julián Marías Aguilera
 Nicanor Piñole Rodríguez
 Mariano Rodríguez-Avial y Azcunaga
 Andrés Suárez y Suárez
 Miguel Allue Escudero
 Antonio Hernández Gil
 Salvador de Madariaga Rojo
 Valentín Matilla Gómez
 Gabriel Sánchez de la Cuesta y Gutiérrez
 José Joaquín Sancho Dronda
 Ángel Verdasco García
 Eduardo García-Rodeja Fernández

1979 
 Ahmadu Mahtar M'Bow
 Renán Flores Jaramillo
 Rodolfo Barón Castro
 Enrico Cerulli
 Gustavo García de Paredes
 Luis Alberto Machado
 Claudio Sánchez-Albornoz y Menduiña
 Luis Díez del Corral y Pedruzo
 Aurelio Menéndez Menéndez
 Narciso Murillo Ferrol
 José Ortiz Díaz
 Pablo Sanz Pedrero
 Víctor L. Urquidi

1980 
 Eduardo de Mattos Portella
 Jacques Lassaigne
 Pedro Barceló Torrent
 Arturo Uslar Pietri
 Antonio Domínguez Ortiz

1981 
 Víctor García Hoz
 Carmen Romano de López-Portillo, primera dama de México.

1982
 José Antonio de Bonilla y Mir
 Miguel Vizcaíno Márquez
 Carlos Asensio Bretones
 Emilio Martín Martín
 Gilberto Freyre
 Carlos Alban Holguin
 Hermenegildo Baylos Corroza
 Rodrigo García-Conde y Huerta
 Juan Obiols Vie
 Joaquín María de Aguinaga Torrano
 Jesús Aguirre y Ortiz de Zárate
 Emiliano José Alfaro Arregui
 Julio Rodríguez Villanueva
 Angel Antonio Lago Carballo
 Saturnino de la Plaza Pérez
 Manuel Utande Igualada
 Fernando Valderrama Martínez
 Ruperto Andués Fuertes
 Francisco Arance Sánchez
 Victoriano Colodrón Gómez
 Manuel de Puelles Benítez
 Juan Antonio Samaranch Torelló
 Joaquín Colomer Sala
 Carlos Chagas Filho
 Enrique Fernández Caldas
 Roberto Marinho
 Guilherme Oliveira Figueiredo
 Francisco Javier Vallaure y Fernández Peña
 Abel Barahona Garrido
 Faustino Rubalcaba Troncoso
 Guillermo Colom Casasnovas
 Juan Corominas Vigneaux
 Vicente Gilsanz García
 Faustino Gutiérrez-Alviz y Armario
 César Pemán Pemartín
 Vicente Sánchez Araña

1983 
 Jorge Luis Borges Acevedo
 Adnan Badran
 Francisco Grande Covián
 Rafael Lapesa Melgar
 Luis Solé Sabaris
 Sema Tanguiane
 Victoriano Luis Michelena Elissalt
 Raymond Carr
 Frederick J. Norton
 Silvio Zavala
 Georges Demerson

1984 
 Joaquín Barraquer Moner
 Miguel Batllori Munné
 José Ferrater Mora
 Joseph Pérez
 Leopoldo Zea

1985 
 José Prat García
 Mariano Aguilar Navarro
 José Cuatrecasas Arumi
 José Luis López Aranguren
 Enrique Ras Oliva
 Enrique Tierno Galván
 José María Valverde Pacheco

1986 
 Octavio Paz

1987 
 Santiago Grisolía García
 Alfredo Muiños Simón
 Emilio Alarcos Llorach
 Bartolomé Bennassar
 Francisco Bernis Madrazo
 Manuel Cardona Castro
 John Elliott
 Felipe González Vicén
 Emilio Lamo de Espinosa y Michels de Champourcin
 Emilio Lledó Íñigo
 Jordi Nadal Oller
 Felipe Ruiz Martín
 Gonzalo Torrente Ballester
 Juan Vila Valentí

1988 
 Luis Gómez Llorente
 Marta Mata i Garriga
 Mariano Pérez Galán
 Eloy Terrón Abad
 Julia Vigre García
 Eulalia Vintro Castells
 Eduardo Nicol
 Adolfo Sánchez Vázquez
 Julio Caro Baroja

1992 
 Manuel Broseta Pont

1993 
 Soledad Ortega Spottorno
 Emilio García Gómez

1994 
 María del Carmen Iglesias Cano
 Joaquim Veríssimo Serrao
 Iñigo Cavero Lataillade
 José Manuel Otero Novas
 Luis González Seara
 Juan Antonio Ortega y Díaz Ambrona
 José María Maravall Herrero
 Cayetano López Martínez
 Mohamed Kabbaj

1995 
 Juan Vivancos Gallego
 José Ignacio Barraquer Moner
 José María Bricall Masip
 Martín González del Valle y Herrero
 Pedro Pascual de Sans
 Mariano Yela

1996 
 Javier Solana Madariaga
 Manuel Tuñón de Lara
 Miguel Artola Gallego
 Pierre Vilar
 Jaime Lissavetzky Díez
 Álvaro Mutis
 Juan Marichal
 José Torreblanca Prieto
 Alfredo Kraus Trujillo
 Emilio Olabarría Muñoz
 Geoffrey Parker
 Jonathan Brown
 Santiago Gascón Muñoz
 Francisco Rodríguez Adrados

1997 
 José Antonio González Caviedes
 Javier Benjumea Puigcerver
 John Brademas
 Fernando Lázaro Carreter
 José Luis Martínez Rodríguez
 Fernando Morán López
 Salvador Velayos Hermida
 Josep Vergés i Matas
 Yulla Halberstadt
 Marcos Guimerá Peraza

1998 
 Pedro Miguel Echenique Landiríbar
 Guido Münch Paniagua
 Alfredo Pérez Rubalcaba
 Carlos Robles Piquer
 Jerónimo Saavedra Acevedo
 Antonio Sáenz de Miera López
 Gustavo Suárez Pertierra
 Antonio Fontán Pérez
 Carlos Egea Krauel
 Hans Meinke
 Mariano Fernández-Daza Fernández de Córdoba
 Fabio Roversi-Monaco

1999 
 José Tomás Raga Gil
 Jaime Gil Aluja
 Pere Antoni Serra Bauzá
 Juan Salvat Dalmau
 Pere Vicens Rahola
 Arturo Ripstein Rosen
 Guillermo Luca de Tena y Brunet
 Francisco Pérez González
 Peter Schuler-Indermühle
 Juan Herrera Fernández
 Gonzalo Anes y Álvarez de Castrillón
 Rafael Benjumea y Cabeza de Vaca
 Rafael Cadórniga Carro
 Enrique Casado de Frías
 Jorge Cervós Navarro
 Salvador Claramunt Rodríguez
 Germán Colón Doménech
 Eugenio Coseriu
 Diego Espín Cánovas
 Fernando González Ollé
 Manuel Jiménez de Parga Cabrera
 Bernard Pottier
 Antonio Quilis Morales
 Mercedes Salisachs Roviralta
 Gregorio Salvador Caja
 José Ángel Sánchez Asiaín
 Manuel Seco Reymundo
 María Soriano Llorente (a título póstumo).
 Philippe Schoutheete de Tervarent
 Alonso Zamora Vicente
 Juan Miguel Lope Blanch
 Miguel León-Portilla
 José Moreno de Alba
 Luis González González
 Harriet Godfrey Peters
 Esteban Vicente Pérez

2000
 Andrés Ollero Tassara
 Rafael Arias-Salgado Montalvo
 Raúl Vázquez Gómez
 Claudio Bravo Camus
 Manuel Marín González
 Marcelino Oreja Aguirre
 José Antonio Fernández Ordóñez

2001
 Cayetana Fitz-James Stuart
 José Ignacio González-Aller Hierro
 Fernando Chueca Goitia
 Luis García-San Miguel Rodríguez-Arango
 Antonio Millán Puelles
 José Bello Lasierra
 Ignasi de Solà-Morales i Rubió

2002
 Enrique Krauze
 Josefina Attard y Tello
 José Jiménez Blanco
 Manuel Agud Querol
 Gregorio Marañón y Bertrán de Lis
 Salustiano del Campo Urbano
 Emilio Fernández-Galiano Fernández
 Josefina Gómez Mendoza
 Carlos Seco Serrano
 Íñigo de Oriol e Ybarra

2003 
 Margarita Salas Falgueras
 Diego del Alcázar Silvela
 Miguel Beltrán Villalva
 Joaquín Bosque Maurel
 Manuel Escudero Fernández
 José Manuel González Páramo
 Juan Jiménez Collado
 Rodolfo Núñez de las Cuevas
 Vicente Ortega Castro
 Christine Ruiz-Picasso
 Bernard Ruiz-Picasso
 Joaquín Coello Brufau
 Jesús Hortal Sánchez
 Manuel Jesús Lagares Calvo
 Manuel Ramírez Jiménez
 Kurt Reichenberger
 Roswitha Schagen
 Margarita de Borbón y Borbón-Dos Sicilias, Infanta de España
 Carlos Zurita
 Claudio Boada Villalonga
 Ramón Boixados Male
 José María Macarulla Greoles
 Esteban Santiago Calvo
 José María Gironella Pous

2005 
 Antón García Abril
 Josefa Rodríguez Álvarez
 Francisco José Vázquez Vázquez
 Rosa Aguilar Rivero
 Enrique Bustamante Ramírez
 Victoria Camps Cervera
 Fernando Fernández Savater
 Fernando González Urbaneja
 Fernando Buesa Blanco (a título póstumo).
 María Cascales Angosto
 José Ramón Recalde Díez

2006 
 María Dolores Gómez de Ávila
 Francisco José Piñón
 Elvira Ontañón Sánchez-Arbós
 Graciela Palau de Nemes
 José Rosón Trespalacios

2007 
 Fernando Fernán Gómez
 María Dolors Abelló Planas
 Juan José Badiola Díez
 Josefina Castellví Piulachs
 María Rosa de la Cierva y de Hoces
 Antonio Embid Irujo
 Alfredo Fierro Bardají
 Luis López Guerra
 Francisco Michavila Pitarch
 Juan Rojo Alaminos
 José Segovia Pérez
 Fernando Tejerina García
 Virgilio Zapatero Gómez

2008 
 Enrique Guerrero Salom
 Fernando Gurrea Casamayor
 Francisco José Marcellán Español
 Miguel Ángel Quintanilla Fisac
 Alejandro Tiana Ferrer
 Manuel Alexandre Abarca
 Jesús Usón Gargallo

2010

 José Antonio Labordeta Subías

2011
 María Jesús San Segundo Gómez de Cadiñanos
 Enrique Franco Manera
 Mercedes Cabrera Calvo-Sotelo
 Ismael Fernández de la Cuesta y González de Prado
 Manuel Carra Fernández
 Alicia Gómez-Navarro Navarrete
 José García-Velasco García
 José Antonio García Caridad
 Eva Almunia Badía
 Amparo Valcarce García
 Marina Grigorievna Polisar
 Eusebio Leal Spengler

2012
 Plácido Arango Arias
 Miguel Ángel Bezos Pérez
 Gonzalo Díaz Díaz
 Ricardo Fernández Gracia
 Alejandro Font de Mora Turón
 Carmen Maestro Martín
 Eugenio Nasarre Goicoechea
 César Nombela Cano
 Francisco Sánchez Martínez
 Juan Velarde Fuertes

2013
 Manuel Díaz-Rubio García
 Manuel González Jiménez
 José Antonio Ibáñez-Martín
 Patricia Phelps de Cisneros
 Teresa Berganza

2014
 Esperanza Aguirre
 Pilar del Castillo
 Juan Díez Nicolás
 María Cándida Fernández Baños
 Ángel Gabilondo
 Francesc Granell
 Julio Iglesias de Ussel
 Esther Koplowitz
 Luis Moisset de Espanés
 Rafael Puyol Antolín
 Hugh Thomas

2015 
 Lina Morgan (a título póstumo).

2016 
 Gonzalo Suárez.
 Felipe Segovia Olmo (a título póstumo).
 Peridis.
 Luis del Olmo Marote.
 Sofía Corradi.
 Jean Canavaggio.
 Miguel de la Quadra-Salcedo (a título póstumo).
 Mohamed Ibn Azzuz Hakim (a título póstumo). 
 Carmen Balcells (a título póstumo). 
 Ana Diosdado (a título póstumo). 
 Jesús Hermida (a título póstumo). 
 José Lladó Fernández-Urrutia.
 Faustino Menéndez Pidal.
 Androulla Vassilliou. 
 Rafael Anson Oliart. 
 Carmen Maura. 
 Cristóbal Halffter. 
 Ruggero Raimondi. 
 Henry Kamen. 
 José Manuel Blecua. 
 Mechthild Strausfeld. 
 Luis Díez-Picazo y Ponce de León (a título póstumo).
 Dario Franceschini.
 Concha Velasco.
 María Dolores Pradera.
 Julia Gutiérrez Caba.
 Amelia Valcárcel.
 Felipe Fernández-Armesto.
 José Antonio Escudero.
 Jorge Edwards.
 Plácido Domingo.
 Liz Mohn.
 Francisco Luzón.
 Joaquim Molins.

2017 
 José Joaquín de Ysasi-Ysasmendi Adaro
 Gustavo Torner de la Fuente
 Marianne Thyssen
 Gil Carlos Rodríguez Iglesias
 Renzo Piano
 Hermann Parzinger
 Soledad Lorenzo García
 Carmen Laffón de la Escosura
 Alicia Koplowitz Romero de Juseu
 Rebeca Grynspan Mayufis
 Valentín Fuster Carulla
 Irina Bokova
 Víctor García de la Concha
 Guillermo de la Dehesa Romero
 Miguel Zugaza Miranda
 Carlos Solchaga Catalán
 Gil Parrondo (a título póstumo).

2019 
 Fernando Arrabal
 Francisco Calvo Serraller (a título póstumo).

Plate holders

1933 
 María Tereza Montoya

1951 
 José María de la Vega

1963 
 Benigno Janín Campo
 Buenaventura Bassegada Muste
 Fernando Martín Panizo

1967 
 Rafael Manzano Martos

1970 
 José Manuel Paredes Grosso

1973 
 Florencio del Pozo Frutos

1975 
 Fidel Mato Vázquez

1978 
 Ramón Agenjo Cecilia

1980 
 Jorge España-Heredia Briales

1991 
 Daniel Céspedes Navas

1995 
 Helena Elsa Reyna Pastor Baños

1996 
 Francisco Javier Carrillo Montesinos

2000 
 Antonio Delgado Porras

2004 
 Birgit Grodal
 Jean Jacques Laffont

2010 
 Manuel de Castro Barco

2016 
 Ana María Muñoz Merino. 
 Emmanuela Gambini Chiappeta.
 Fidel López Álvarez.
 Dídac Ramírez i Sarrió
 José Antonio Lasheras Corruchaga (a título póstumo).
 José Ignacio Sánchez Pérez. 
 Juan Antonio Montesinos García (a título póstumo). 
 Lucero Tena. 
 Magí Castelltort Claramunt. 
 María Teresa Lizaranzu Perinat. 
 Paolo Pinamonti. 
 Pau Roca Blasco.
 Santiago Iñiguez de Onzoño. 
 Ymelda Moreno y de Arteaga Marquesa de Poza.

2017 
 Mariano Bellver Utrera.
 Lorena González Olivares.
 Miguel Ángel Recio Crespo.
 José Pascual Marco Martínez.
 Segundo Píriz Durán.
 Daniel Hernández Ruipérez.
 José Luis Blanco López.
 Pedro de Borbón-Dos Sicilias y Orleans.

Members

1947 
 Juan Cabré Aguiló
 Francisco Pérez-Pons Jover

1959 
 Aurelio Cazenave Ferrer

1964 
 Luis Seco de Lucena Paredes

1965 
 Juan Portús Serrano

1966 
 Andrés Seoane
 Nicolás González Bellido

1967 
 Francisco Olid Maysounave
 Luis Izquierdo
 Lucio Lascaray Ondarra

1978 
 Enrique Barajas Vallejo
 Anselmo Pardo Alcaide

2010 
 Milagros Blanco Pardo
 Juan Iglesias Marcelo
 Antonio Lara Ramos
 Konrado Mugertza Urkidi
 Pedro Orteha Marhuenda
 Orlando Suárez Curbelo

2011 
 María Luisa Martín Martín
 José Antonio Martínez Sánchez
 José Manuel Martínez Vega
 José Mario Rodríguez Alvariño
 Augusto Serrano Olmedo

2012 
 Francisco López Rupérez

2016 
 Marino Andrés García
 Francisco Baila Herrera
 Raúl Fernández Ortega
 Gabriel Fernández Rojas
 Pedro José Gonzalez Felipe
 Juan Carlos González Méndez
 José Miguel Jiménez 
 Jordi Labres Palmer
 Luis Navarro Candel
 Rosa María Rodríguez Grande

2017 
 Carmen Alarcón Rosell
 María Asunción Milá Sagnier
 Cristina del Río Navarro

Cross

1941 

 Carlos Benítez Dalfó

1957 

 José Lloret Talens
 Jesús Llorca Radal 
 Luis López Prieto

1960 

José María Portugués Hernando

1965 

 Julian Varela Lorbes

1970 

 Juan Ramírez González
 Ramón Serrano Salom

1972 

 Gonzalo Miguel Pascual

1975 
 Andrés Jaque Amador

1976 
 Esteban Leonardo García Cela

1981 

 Antonio Olmedo Esteve

1983 

 Nicolás Borja Pérez

1991 

 Lorenzo Vidal Vidal

1996 
 Angel Luis Abós Santabarba
 Ramón Acín Fanlo
 José Luis Alcalá Vargas
 Hilario Alvarez Fernández
 Inocencia Arbelo Alayón
 Ramón Arozamena Sanzberro
 María Luisa Bailo Aznar
 Javier Blasco Zumeta
 Mariano Blázquez Fabián
 Evelio Carbonero Arroyo
 Andréu Crespí Plaza
 Trinidad Crespo Alvarez
 Eusebio Cueto Pradas
 Marciano Cuesta Polo
 Carmen Culla Cortés
 Jacob Chocrón Murciano
 Santiago Debón Tortosa
 José Luis Espinosa Iborra
 María Victoria Gallardo Núñez
 María del Carmen García Arribas
 Juan Gómez Castillo
 José Gómez Gijón
 José Gómez Gil
 Pablo González Pérez
 José Luis González Uriol
 María Paz Gracia Gabarre
 María de los Angeles de las Heras y Núñez
 Primitiva Herrero Rosales
 Antonia Jiménez Robles
 Pilar de Larios Vega
 Juan Latorre Durán
 Jesús Lérida Domínguez
 Rodrigo López Lafuente
 Angel Llorente Morales (a título póstumo).
 Josefa Marcos Martín
 María del Pilar Martín Arribas
 Adelaida Martín Sánchez
 Pilar Matilla Gómez
 Santos Mazagatos García
 Asunción Merino García
 Javier Monente Zardoya
 Sebastián Monzón Suárez
 María del Carmen Moreno Gorrón
 José Muñoz Bueno
 Pablo Eugenio Muro Sivert
 Florencio Navarrete Romero
 María Noriega Alvarez
 Carlos Orden Gonzalo
 Carlos Salvador Pérez Bustos
 Herminio Ramos Pérez
 Georgina Rodríguez Díaz
 Eladio Rodríguez Ferrón
 Vicenta Rodríguez Rodríguez
 Jesús José Rodríguez Rodríguez de Lama
 Salustiano Rodríguez Vera
 Vicente Ruiz Gañán
 José Evaristo Sánchez Hernández
 Salvador Sandoval López
 José Sanz Barrio
 Adolfo Senosiain Murugarren
 Francisco José Serrano Gil
 Jesús Angel Terán Fernández
 Isidoro Torres Cardona
 Álvaro del Valle García
 Modesto Vega Alonso
 Antonio Velasco López de Ocariz
 Juan Antonio Vicente Pérez
 María Luz Vidal Sanjuán
 Juana María del Carmen Villavieja Vega (a título póstumo).

1997 
 Ramón Calsapeu i Cantó

2006 

 Jordi Bonet i Armengol 
 Mario Díaz Martínez
 Enrique López Viguria
 Agustín Matía Amor
 Aintzane Monteverde Asua
 Antonieta Montserrat i Robert
 José Antonio Warletta García
 Antonio Alaminos López
 Sara Alba Corral
 Julián Aso Ezquerra
 Rafael Bailo Pola
 Gonzalo Bercero Ingelmo
 Miguel del Cerro Calvo
 María del Carmen Cuadrado Solano
 José Fernández Vivero
 Francisco Gallego Monserrate
 Jesús Ángel González Isla
 José Antonio Lázaro Velamazán
 José María López Lacárcel
 Antonio Llorente Simón
 Santiago Matas Utrilla
 José Manuel Prieto González
 Antonio Serrano Vinué
 José Manuel Sixto Nogueira
 Julio del Valle de Iscar

2007 
 Juan Antonio Gómez Trinidad
 Dionisio Cueva González

2009 
 Pedro López Cuevas

2011 
 Adolfo Héctor Alonso Abella
 Santiago Arellano Hernández
 José Luis Balibrea Cantero
 Enrique Ballester Sarrias
 Juan Rafael Cabrera Afonso
 Rafael Caro Ruiz
 Juan Chamorro González
 José António Falcão
 Luis Miguel Falcón García
 Román Felones Morrás
 Paciano Fermoso Estébanez
 Juan González Ruiz
 Carlos Antonio de las Heras Pedrosa
 Guillermo Herrero Maté
 José Antonio Ibáñez-Martín y Mellado
 Luis Eladio Jorcano Íñiguez
 Soledad Lera Miguel (Sor Teresa).
 Pedro Lorenzo Fernández
 Daniel Lucendo Serrano
 José Luis Magro Esteban
 Miguel Ángel Mansilla y Rodríguez
 José Manuel Martín Cisneros
 José Antonio Martínez Álvarez
 Juan Francisco Martínez Tirado
 Carlos Jesús Medina Ávila
 Emilio Reina González
 Luis Pablo Rodríguez Rodríguez
 Pedro Felipe Sánchez Granados
 José Villasante Colina
 Yosuke Yamashita

Tie

1988 

 Capilla del Misterio de Elche

1995 

 Orquesta Sinfónica de Radio Televisión Española

1998 

 Institución Fernando el Católico
 Real Instituto Jovellanos

2000 

 Guardia Civil
 Cuerpo Nacional de Policía

2003 

 Banda Municipal de Valencia

2005 

 Colegio de Infantes de Nuestra Señora del Pilar
 Escolanía de Montserrat

2006 

 Federación Española de Religiosos de la Enseñanza
 Federación de Escultismo en España (FEE).

2007 

 Colegio San Patricio
 Colegio Nuestra Señora del Pilar
 Federación de Trabajadores de la Enseñanza de la Unión General de Trabajadores (FETE-UGT).
 Orden de las Escuelas Pías

2011 

 Fundación Tomillo
 Fundación de Ayuda contra la Drogradicción
 Asociación de Institutos Históricos de España

2014 

 Academia General Militar de Zaragoza

Plate of honor

1998 

 Tabularium Artis Asturiensis, archivo de arte asturiano

2009 
 Colegio de Educación Infantil y Primaria Ramiro Solans de Zaragoza.

2010 
 Colegio de Educación Infantil y Primaria León Solá (Melilla).
 Instituto de Educación Secundaria Mateo Alemán de Alcalá de Henares (Madrid).

2016 
 Instituto de Educación Secundaria Alfonso X el Sabio (Murcia).

2017 
 Agrupación Musical de Guardo (AMGu) de Guardo (Palencia).

References

External links 
 Boletín Oficial del Estado (BOE)
 BOE. Colección histórica (Gazeta)